Angie Sabrina González Garcia (born 3 January 1981) is a Venezuelan track and road cyclist. At the 2008 Summer Olympics, she competed in the women's road race, finishing in 57th place. At the 2012 Summer Olympics, she competed in the Women's Omnium, finishing in 18th (last) place overall.

Major results

Road

2003
 1st  Road race, National Road Championships
2005
 2nd Road race, National Road Championships
 3rd  Sprint, Pan American Track Championships
2007
 4th Road race, National Road Championships
2008
 1st Clasico Aniversario de la Federacion Venezolana de Ciclismo
 3rd Road race, National Road Championships
 6th Copa Federacion Venezolana de Ciclismo
2009
 3rd Road race, National Road Championships
2010
 1st  Road race, Central American and Caribbean Games
 2nd Time trial, National Road Championships
 4th Road race, Pan American Road and Track Championships
2011
 National Road Championships
1st  Road race
2nd Time trial
 1st Clásico Aniversario Federacion Ciclista de Venezuela
 1st Clasico Corre Por La Vida
 7th Road race, Pan American Games
2012
 National Road Championships
1st  Road race
3rd Time trial
 1st Copa Fundadeporte
 2nd Road race, Juegos Nacionales Venezuela
 2nd Clásico Aniversario Federacion Ciclista de Venezuela
2013
 Pan American Road Championships
3rd  Road race
6th Time trial
 3rd  Time trial, Bolivarian Games
2014
 1st Copa Federación Venezolana de Ciclismo
 National Road Championships
2nd Road race
2nd Time trial
 3rd Clasico FVCiclismo Corre Por la VIDA
 5th Time trial, Pan American Road Championships
2015
 5th Copa Federación Venezolana de Ciclismo
 8th Clasico FVCiclismo Corre Por la VIDA
2017
 2nd Road race, National Road Championships
2019
 1st Tour Femenino de Venezuela I
 8th Overall Tour Femenino de Venezuela II
1st Stage 2
2020
 2nd Time trial, National Road Championships

Track

2005
 3rd  Sprint, Pan American Track Championships
2006
 Pan American Track Championships
2nd  500m time trial
2nd  Keirin
3rd  Sprint
2007
 Pan American Road and Track Championships
1st  Team sprint (with Karelia Machado)
3rd  500m time trial
2010
 Central American and Caribbean Games
1st  Omnium
1st  Team sprint (with Daniela Larreal)
2nd  Scratch
 South American Games
2nd  Points race
2nd  Team pursuit
3rd  Team sprint
 2nd  Omnium, Pan American Track Championships
2011
 1st  Omnium, Pan American Games
 2nd  Team pursuit, Pan American Track Championships
2012
 National Track Championships
1st  Omnium
2nd Points race
2nd Scratch
 Pan American Track Championships
2nd  Omnium
2nd  Team pursuit (with Danielys García and Lilibeth Chacón)
2013
 1st  Team pursuit, Bolivarian Games
 Pan American Track Championships
2nd  Omnium
3rd  Team pursuit (with Jennifer Cesar and Danielys García)
2014
 Central American and Caribbean Games
1st  Scratch
3rd  Omnium
 Copa Venezuela
1st Omnium
1st Points race
 3rd  Team pursuit, Pan American Track Championships (with Jennifer Cesar, Lilibeth Chacón and Zuralmy Rivas)
2015
 1st Omnium, Copa Venezuela
 Copa Cuba de Pista
2nd Scratch
3rd Omnium
 3rd  Omnium, Pan American Track Championships
2016
 2nd Scratch, Copa Venezuela
 3rd Scratch, Festival of Speed
2017
 Bolivarian Games
1st  Omnium
1st  Scratch
 Pan American Track Championships
2nd  Points race
3rd  Omnium

References

External links
 

1981 births
Living people
Venezuelan female cyclists
Venezuelan track cyclists
Olympic cyclists of Venezuela
Cyclists at the 2008 Summer Olympics
Cyclists at the 2012 Summer Olympics
Cyclists at the 2016 Summer Olympics
Pan American Games gold medalists for Venezuela
Pan American Games medalists in cycling
Cyclists at the 2003 Pan American Games
Cyclists at the 2015 Pan American Games
Cyclists at the 2019 Pan American Games
Medalists at the 2011 Pan American Games
South American Games silver medalists for Venezuela
South American Games bronze medalists for Venezuela
South American Games medalists in cycling
Competitors at the 2010 South American Games
Central American and Caribbean Games medalists in cycling
Central American and Caribbean Games gold medalists for Venezuela
Central American and Caribbean Games silver medalists for Venezuela
Competitors at the 2010 Central American and Caribbean Games
Competitors at the 2014 Central American and Caribbean Games
People from Aragua
20th-century Venezuelan women
21st-century Venezuelan women